Dolwahal Dam, also called Weir Dam is an earthfill dam on Kundalika river near Roha, Raigad district in the state of Maharashtra in India.

Specifications

Purpose
 Irrigation
 Water Supply

See also
 Dams in Maharashtra
 List of reservoirs and dams in India

References

Dams in Raigad district
Dams completed in 1969
1969 establishments in Maharashtra